Pycnogonum is a genus of sea spiders in the family Pycnogonidae. It is the type genus of the family.

Etymology 
The generic name literally means “dense knees”. Pycnogonum combines the prefix  (from ‘dense’ in Greek) with the Greek word for "knee": .

Characteristics
Members of the genus Pycnogonum have squarish bodies with a tough integument and a few hairs. The cephalon (the anterior end of the body which is fused with the first segment of the trunk) has a long smooth proboscis and a low tubercle on which the eyes are set. There are no chelicerae or palps and these sea spiders use their proboscis to suck juices from their prey. On the first segment of the trunk of males there are small ovigerous legs with nine segments. The larvae are carried around by the males on these appendages. The four pairs of ambulatory legs are short but strong, with well-developed terminal claws. The genital openings are on the second segment of the posterior pair of legs.<ref>[http://species-identification.org/species.php?species_group=pycnogonida&menuentry=groepen&id=13&tab=beschrijving Genus Pycnogonum] Marine Species Identification Portal. Retrieved 2011-11-22.</ref>

Species
The World Register of Marine Species lists the following species:Pycnogonum africanum Calman, 1938Pycnogonum aleuticum Turpaeva, 1994Pycnogonum angulirostrum Stock, 1959Pycnogonum anovigerum Clark, 1956Pycnogonum arbustum Stock, 1966Pycnogonum asiaticum Muller, 1992Pycnogonum aurilineatum Flynn, 1919Pycnogonum benokianum Ohshima, 1935Pycnogonum buticulosum Hedgpeth, 1949Pycnogonum calculum Bamber, 1995Pycnogonum callosum Losina-Losinsky, 1961Pycnogonum carinatum Staples, 2002Pycnogonum cataphractum Mobius, 1902Pycnogonum cessaci Bouvier, 1911Pycnogonum clarki Staples, 2002Pycnogonum coninsulum Bamber, 2008Pycnogonum cranaobyrsa Bamber, 2004Pycnogonum crassirostrum Sars, 1888Pycnogonum crosnieri Stock, 1991Pycnogonum daguilarensis Bamber, 1997Pycnogonum diceros Marcus, 1940Pycnogonum elephas Stock, 1966Pycnogonum eltanin Fry & Hedgpeth, 1969Pycnogonum forte Flynn, 1928Pycnogonum gaini Bouvier, 1910Pycnogonum gibberum Marcus & du Bois Reymond-M., 1963Pycnogonum gordonae Pushkin, 1984Pycnogonum grumus Arango, 2003Pycnogonum guyanae Stock, 1975Pycnogonum hancocki Schmitt, 1934Pycnogonum indicum Sundara Raj, 1930Pycnogonum kussakini Turpaeva, 2000Pycnogonum litorale (Strom, 1762)Pycnogonum lobipes Stock, 1991Pycnogonum madagascariensis Bouvier, 1911Pycnogonum magellanicum Hoek, 1898Pycnogonum magnirostrum Mobius, 1902Pycnogonum microps LomanPycnogonum minutum Losina-Losinsky & Kopaneva, 1973Pycnogonum moniliferum Stock, 1991Pycnogonum moolenbeeki Stock, 1992Pycnogonum mucronatum Loman, 1908Pycnogonum musaicum Stock, 1994Pycnogonum nodulosum Dohrn, 1881Pycnogonum occa Loman, 1908Pycnogonum orientale (Dana, 1849)Pycnogonum ornans Stock, 1992Pycnogonum panamum Hilton, 1942Pycnogonum paragaini Munilla, 1990Pycnogonum planum Stock, 1954Pycnogonum platylophum Loman, 1923Pycnogonum plumipes Stock, 1960Pycnogonum portus Barnard, 1946Pycnogonum pusillum Dohrn, 1881Pycnogonum pustulatum Stock, 1994Pycnogonum repentinum Turpaeva, 2003Pycnogonum repentium Turpaeva, 2003Pycnogonum reticulatum Hedgpeth, 1948Pycnogonum rickettsi Schmitt, 1934Pycnogonum saxulum Child, 1998Pycnogonum sivertseni Stock, 1955Pycnogonum spatium Takahashi, Dick & Mawatari, 2007Pycnogonum stearnsi Ives, 1883Pycnogonum stylidium Child, 1995Pycnogonum tenue Slater, 1879Pycnogonum tesselatum Stock, 1968Pycnogonum torresi Clark, 1963Pycnogonum tuberculatum Clark, 1963Pycnogonum tumulosum Loman, 1908Pycnogonum uedai Nakamura & Child, 1983Pycnogonum ungellatum'' Loman, 1911

References

Pycnogonids